The 39th Los Angeles Film Critics Association Awards, given by the Los Angeles Film Critics Association (LAFCA), honored the best in film for 2013.

Winners

Best Picture (TIE):
Gravity
Her
Best Director:
Alfonso Cuarón – Gravity
Runner-up: Spike Jonze – Her
Best Actor:
Bruce Dern – Nebraska
Runner-up: Chiwetel Ejiofor – 12 Years a Slave
Best Actress (TIE):
Cate Blanchett – Blue Jasmine
Adèle Exarchopoulos – Blue Is the Warmest Colour
Best Supporting Actor (TIE):
James Franco – Spring Breakers
Jared Leto – Dallas Buyers Club
Best Supporting Actress:
Lupita Nyong'o – 12 Years a Slave
Runner-up: June Squibb – Nebraska
Best Screenplay:
Richard Linklater, Ethan Hawke, and Julie Delpy – Before Midnight
Runner-up: Spike Jonze – Her
Best Cinematography:
Emmanuel Lubezki – Gravity
Runner-up: Bruno Delbonnel – Inside Llewyn Davis
Best Editing:
Alfonso Cuarón and Mark Sanger – Gravity
Runner-up: Shane Carruth and David Lowery – Upstream Color
Best Production Design:
K. K. Barrett – Her
Runner-up: Jess Gonchor – Inside Llewyn Davis
Best Music Score:
T Bone Burnett – Inside Llewyn Davis
Runner-up: Arcade Fire and Owen Pallett – Her
Best Foreign Language Film:
Blue Is the Warmest Colour • France
Runner-up: The Great Beauty • Italy
Best Documentary/Non-Fiction Film:
Stories We Tell
Runner-up: The Act of Killing
Best Animation:
Ernest & Celestine
Runner-up: The Wind Rises
New Generation Award:
Megan Ellison
Career Achievement Award:
Richard Lester
The Douglas Edwards Experimental/Independent Film/Video Award:
Charlotte Pryce – Cabinets of Wonder: Films and a Performance by Charlotte Pryce

References

External links
 39th Annual Los Angeles Film Critics Association Awards

2013
2013 film awards
2013 in American cinema
2013 in Los Angeles
December 2013 events in the United States